Astrit Selmani (born 13 May 1997) is a professional footballer who plays as a centre-forward for FC Midtjylland in the Danish Superliga, on loan from Hapoel Be'er Sheva. Born in Sweden, he represents the Kosovo national team.

Club career

Early career and Superettan debut
Selmani started to play football with local club Malmö FF as a youngster. In 2009, at age 12, he injured his cruciate ligament and left the club for Kulladals IF. At the age of 17, Selmani joined BK Olympic in Division 3, the Swedish fifth tier, where he made his senior debut. In total, he played 37 matches and scored 14 goals for the side. Before the start of the 2016 season, Selmani joined Ängelholms FF in Superettan, Sweden's second highest league. On 3 April 2016, he made his debut in a 1–0 home win against Syrianska FC, after coming on as a substitute in the 81st minute in place of Oliver Stojanović-Fredin.

Years in the third tier

Kristianstad FC
On 17 July 2016, Selmani joined Division 1 side Kristianstad FC in the third tier. On 21 August 2016, he made his debut in a 1–0 away defeat against Landskrona BoIS after coming on as a substitute in the 84th minute in place of Anton Bloom.

FC Rosengård
On 24 November 2016, Selmani joined fellow Division 1 club FC Rosengård, a transfer that came to effect in January 2017. On 15 April the same year, he made his debut in a 0–1 home defeat against Skövde AIK, after coming on as a substitute in the 75th minute in place of Mohamed Ramadan.

Torns IF
On 8 February 2018, Selmani joined Torns IF in Division 1. Two months later, he made his competitive debut for the club in a 1–2 away win against Lunds BK after being named in the starting line-up.

Varbergs BoIS

2019 season
On 21 January 2019, Selmani returned to Superettan, joining Varbergs BoIS. On 30 March 2019, he made his debut against Mjällby AIF after being named in the starting line-up and scored his side's only goal in a 0–1 away win. Scoring 15 goals in 27 league games, he led the team to their first promotion to Allsvenskan, finishing 2nd in the table.

2020 season
In 2020, Selmani captained the side in Allsvenskan, as Varberg finished 11th in their first ever season in the Swedish top tier. He scored 15 goals in 24 fixtures placing himself as the second best scorer in Allsvenskan, only behind Christoffer Nyman.

Hammarby IF

On 18 December 2020, Selmani transferred to fellow Allsvenskan club Hammarby IF, signing a four-year contract. The transfer fee was reportedly set at around 7-8 million Swedish kronor, making Selmani the most expensive acquisition in Hammarby's history. 

On 20 February 2021, he made his competitive debut for the club in a group stage match in Svenska Cupen, the main domestic cup, against AFC Eskilstuna after being named in the starting line-up and provided one assist and scored his side's second goal in a 4–1 home win.

On 16 May 2021, Selmani scored his first goal in Allsvenskan for Hammarby in his twelfth appearance for the club in a 2–2 home draw against rivals Djurgårdens IF. Fourteen days later, he won the 2020–21 Svenska Cupen with Hammarby through a 5–4 win on penalties after a full time without goals against BK Häcken in the final, where he scored the deciding penalty.

On 22 July 2021, Selmani made his continental debut in the 2021–22 UEFA Europa Conference League second qualifying round against Slovenian side Maribor after being named in the starting line-up and scored his side's three goals, which were also his first hat-trick for the club during a 3–1 home win. He followed it up by scoring a brace against Čukarički in a 5–1 home win in the second leg (6–4 on aggregate) of the third qualifying round, before the side was knocked out by Basel (4–4 on aggregate) after a penalty shoot-out in the play-off round.

Selmani featured in the final of the 2021–22 Svenska Cupen, in which Hammarby lost by 4–5 on penalties to Malmö FF after the game ended in a 0–0 draw. Selmani was the one who missed the deciding penalty.

Hapoel Be'er Sheva
On 18 July 2022, Selmani transferred to Hapoel Be'er Sheva in the Israeli Premier League, signing a three-year contract. The transfer fee was reportedly set at around 10 million Swedish kronor. His debut with Hapoel Be'er Sheva came three days later in the 2022–23 UEFA Europa Conference League second qualifying round against Dinamo Minsk after coming on as a substitute at 58th minute in place of Sagiv Yehezkel.

Loan to Midtjylland
On 31 January 2023, Selmani was sent on loan to FC Midtjylland through the remainder of the Danish Superliga campaign, with an option to buy.

International career
Born and raised in Sweden, Selmani is of Kosovo Albanian origin from Mitrovica. He was eligible to represent three countries on international level, either Albania, Kosovo or Sweden. On 17 March 2021, the Football Federation of Kosovo announced that Selmani had decided to represent their national team, and was planned to get called up to the 2022 FIFA World Cup qualification matches against Sweden and Spain, but was ultimately left out of the squad due to testing positive for COVID-19.

Selmani was also called-up by Kosovo to the matches in June and September 2021, but due to the lack of a passport he was forced to stay as a unused substitute. On 15 September 2021, seven days after the end of the gathering in the September matches he received his passport. His debut with Kosovo came on 9 October 2021 in the 2022 FIFA World Cup qualification match against Sweden after coming on as a substitute at 70th minute in place of Zymer Bytyqi.

On 24 March 2022, Selmani scored his first goal for Kosovo in his fifth appearance for the country in a 5–0 home win over Burkina Faso.

Career statistics

Club

International

Honours
Hammarby IF
Svenska Cupen: 2020–21

References

External links

1997 births
Living people
Footballers from Malmö
Kosovan men's footballers
Kosovo international footballers
Swedish men's footballers
Swedish people of Kosovan descent
Swedish people of Albanian descent
Association football forwards
Division 3 (Swedish football) players
BK Olympic players
Ettan Fotboll players
Kristianstad FC players
FC Rosengård 1917 players
Torns IF players
Superettan players
Ängelholms FF players
Allsvenskan players
Varbergs BoIS players
Hammarby Fotboll players
Israeli Premier League players
Hapoel Be'er Sheva F.C. players
FC Midtjylland players